The 1972 Australian Rally Championship was a series of six rallying events held across Australia. It was the fifth season in the history of the competition.

Colin Bond and navigator George Shepheard won the Championship for the second year in a row in the Holden Dealer Team Torana GTR XU-1 .

Season review

After a late challenge to the HDT Toranas at the 1971 Southern Cross Rally, the works Mitsubishi Galants were expected to do well in the 1972 Australian Rally Championship and pose a major threat to Harry Firth's HDT domination of the series.  However it was not to be, as the cars were poorly backed up and suffered from various incidents which cost them the chance of any outright wins.  The HDT LJ Torana XU-1's won five of the six rounds, Mitsubishi's best finishes were a second place in the Alpine (for Doug Stewart and Dave Johnson) and thirds in the Warana (Doug Stewart and Dave Johnson) and Snowy Mountains rallies (Doug Chivas and Peter Meyer).  

Another major challenge was expected from Renault.  Their Renault R8 Gordinis had dominated the 1970 season and the new R12 Gordinis were faster and the team was hoping this would ensure some success for 1972.  Tom Barr-Smith was second in the Walkerville 500, and Bob Watson managed a third in the Akademos, but other than that it was a disappointing season. 

Colin Bond and George Shepheard dominated the championship, winning three rounds together and a fourth for Shepheard when he navigated for Frank Kilfoyle in the final round, The Alpine.

The Rallies

The 1972 season featured six events, two each in New South Wales and Victoria; and one each for Queensland and South Australia.

Round One – Bunbury Curran – 16–17 April 1972
310 miles, 54 starters, 39 finishers

Round Two – Akademos Rally – 27–28 May 1972
320 miles, 38 starters, 23 finishers

Round Three – Snowy Mountains Rally – 10–12 June 1972
600 miles, 48 starters, 40 finishers

Round Four – Warana Rally – 23–24 September 1972
450 miles

Round Five – Rothmans Walkerville 500 – 28–29 October 1972
320 miles

Round Six – Alpine Rally – 25–26 November 1972
600 miles

1972 Drivers and Navigators Championships
Final pointscore for 1972 is as follows.

Colin Bond – Champion Driver 1972

George Shepheard – Champion Navigator 1972

References

Rally Championship
Rally competitions in Australia
1972 in rallying